Events in the year 1905 in Portugal.

Incumbents
Monarch: Charles I
Prime Minister: José Luciano de Castro

Events
12 February – Portuguese legislative election, 1905.
Establishment of the Progressive Dissidence political party.

Arts and entertainment

Sports

Births

14 March – José Gralha, Portuguese footballer (deceased)
3 May – Adelino da Palma Carlos, lawyer, scholar and politician (died in 1992)
27 November – José Beltrão, horse rider (d. 1948).

Deaths

References

 
1900s in Portugal
Portugal
Years of the 20th century in Portugal
Portugal